The Battle of Kcynia took place on June 1, 1656, and was one of battles of the Swedish invasion of Poland. It resulted in a victory of Swedish forces, commanded by King Charles X Gustav and Adolph John I, Count Palatine of Kleeburg.

In the spring of 1656, Hetman Stefan Czarniecki carried out a raid in Swedish-occupied Greater Poland, in which he supported Polish guerrilla forces. On May 20, he left Uniejów, and headed northwards, to Royal Prussia, where his division joined local pospolite ruszenie, commanded by Voivode of Malbork Voivodeship, Jakub Weyher. Polish forces camped near Kcynia, feeling safe among the waters of the Noteć river. Meanwhile, Count Adolph John entered Bydgoszcz (May 26).

Czarniecki's raid into Royal Prussia alarmed King Charles X Gustav, who at that time commanded the Siege of Danzig. Charles Gustav decided to act quickly, and in late May, he abandoned the siege, and together with his army marched southwards, reaching Bydgoszcz on May 31, to meet Adolph John.

On June 1, after crossing the Noteć near Rynarzewo, Swedes attacked Czarniecki's camp, completely surprising Poles, whose units were scattered in the area. After an initial skirmish, the Poles began to flee, while Swedish soldiers advanced into the camp. Swedish victory was complete, the camp was destroyed, and several Polish officers were captured, including royal envoy, Jan Dominik Dzialynski.

After the defeat, Czarniecki cancelled his Prussian plans, and following royal orders, marched to Warsaw.

Sources 
	Miroslaw Nagielski, Warszawa 1656, Wydawnictwo Bellona, Warszawa 1990, 
	Leszek Podhorodecki, Rapier i koncerz, Warszawa 1985, 

Kcynia
1656 in Poland
Kcynia
Kcynia